Internatsional may refer to the following places:

in Kyrgyzstan:
Internatsional, Batken, a village in Leylek District, Batken Region
Internatsional, Jalal-Abad, a village in Nooken District, Jalal-Abad Region
Internatsional, Aravan, a village in Aravan District, Osh Region
Internatsional, Nookat, a village in Nookat District, Osh Region
the former name of Üçüncü Beynəlmiləl, Azerbaijan
the former name of Äitei, Almaty, Kazakhstan